Zoë Andrianifaha (born 8 September 1965) is a Malagasy swimmer. He competed in three events at the 1980 Summer Olympics.

References

External links

1965 births
Living people
Malagasy male swimmers
Olympic swimmers of Madagascar
Swimmers at the 1980 Summer Olympics
Place of birth missing (living people)